Foersom and Hiort-Lorenzen is a Danish design duo consisting of Johannes Foersom (born 1947) and Peter Hiort-Lorenzen (born 1943). They have collaborated since 1977 and won a number of awards for their furniture design.

Education
Foersom trained to become a cabinetmaker with Gustav Berthelsen in Copenhagen, completing his apprenticeship in 1969. He then attended the Arts and Crafts School from where he graduated in 1972.

Hiort-Lorenzen became a ship carpenter at Helsingør Shipyard in 1962. He then attended the Arts and Crafts School, from where he graduated in 1965, and the Royal Danish Academy of Fine Arts graduating in 1968.

Works
 Apollo chair
 Trinity chair
 Savannah lounge group

Awards
 1970, 1972, 1977: The Danish State Art's Fund 
 1974, 1975: Kröyer's Memorial Award
 1980: Nationalbanken's Jubilee Fund
 1985: Annual Award of the Danish Furniture manufacturers
 1992, 1994, 1995, 1999: Design Zentrum Nordrhein Westfalen's Prize for high design quality
 1994: Forsnäs Prize
 1995, 1996, 1997_ Bo Bedre's Design Award
 1995: Best of Neocon, Chicago
 1998: Bruno Mathsson Award
 2000: Excellent Swedish Form for table Atlas
 2005: Finn Juhl Prize

References

External links
 Official website

Danish furniture designers
Royal Danish Academy of Fine Arts alumni